VA-84 was a short-lived Attack Squadron of the U.S. Navy. It was established on 15 September 1948 and disestablished on 29 November 1949. The squadron's nickname is the Maulers.

Home port assignments
The squadron was assigned to these home ports, effective on the dates shown:
 NAS Oceana – 15 Sep 1948
 NAS Jacksonville – 5 November 1948

Aircraft assignment
The squadron first received the following aircraft on the dates shown:
 TBM-3E Avenger – Nov 1948
 AM-1 Mauler – 20 Nov 1948

See also
 Attack aircraft
 List of inactive United States Navy aircraft squadrons
 History of the United States Navy

References

Attack squadrons of the United States Navy
Wikipedia articles incorporating text from the Dictionary of American Naval Aviation Squadrons